Cusino is a comune (municipality) in the Province of Como in the Italian region Lombardy, located about  north of Milan and about  north of Como. As of 31 December 2004, it had a population of 247 and an area of 9.7 km².

Cusino borders the following municipalities: Carlazzo, Garzeno, Grandola ed Uniti, San Bartolomeo Val Cavargna.

Population history

References

Cities and towns in Lombardy